Cedar Green is an unincorporated community in Augusta County, Virginia, United States. The Augusta County Training School, which is listed on the National Register of Historic Places, is located near Cedar Green.

References

Unincorporated communities in Augusta County, Virginia
Unincorporated communities in Virginia